Arthur Medworth Ferguson (December 11, 1877 – February 20, 1923) was a United States Army officer who received the Medal of Honor for actions on September 28, 1899, during the Philippine–American War. He later obtained the rank of lieutenant colonel. He had previously been promoted from Corporal after being awarded the Distinguished Service Cross for actions on April 26, 1899. Colonel Ferguson is buried in Arlington National Cemetery.

Medal of Honor citation
Rank and Organization: First Lieutenant, 36th Infantry, U.S. Volunteers. Place and Date: Near Porac, Luzon, Philippine Islands, September 28, 1899. Entered Service At: Burlington, Kansas Birth: Coffey County, Kans. Date of Issue: March 8, 1902.
Citation:

Charged alone a body of the enemy and captured a captain.

Distinguished Service Cross citation
Corporal, U.S. Army
Company E, 20th Kansas Volunteer Infantry
General Orders No. 126, W.D., 1919
Home Town: Burlington, Kansas
Date of Action: April 26, 1899
Citation:

The Distinguished Service Cross is presented to Arthur M. Ferguson, Corporal, U.S. Army, for extraordinary heroism in action at Calumpit, Philippine Islands, April 26, 1899, against an armed enemy.

At the imminent risk of his life Corporal Ferguson voluntarily crawled through a network of iron beams underneath a bridge and, inch by inch, worked his way hand over hand across the bridge until he was underneath an insurgent's outpost, obtaining a complete description of the condition of the bridge.

Career
 Appointed from Kansas, Corporal and Sergeant, Company E. Kansas Infantry, May 2, 1898, to July 14, 1899.
 First Lieutenant, 36th U.S. Volunteer Infantry, July 5, 1899
Second Lieutenant, 14th U.S. Infantry, Regular Army
 First Lieutenant, September 24, 1902
 Awarded Medal of Honor on February 7, 1902
 Awarded Distinguished Service Cross 1919

Other service
Colonel Ferguson later served in the Mexican Border Campaign and World War I. When the war broke out in Europe, Ferguson was assigned to Fort Riley, where he became an instructor at the first officers' training camp. He then became Chief Instructor at the second camp at Fort Snelling.

He was then assigned to the War Department as an assistant adjutant general of the U.S. Army, in charge of enlisted men. He received praise from  Secretary Newton D. Baker and General Pershing. During the last five years of his service, he served as the Secretary for the General Service Schools, Forth Leavenworth, where he organized the books division, which publishes textbooks for U.S. Army officers.

Personal life and marriages
Ferguson was the son of Captain R.W. Ferguson and he married Laura Magill Ferguson who died in 1913.  He remarried, to Sarah Maddocks Ferguson (1889–1973). He is buried next to both of his wives.

Death
Colonel Ferguson died from sudden complications of surgery related to the removal of a hernia. He was survived by his widow, brothers and sisters and his elderly parents.

See also

List of Medal of Honor recipients
List of Philippine–American War Medal of Honor recipients

References

Kansas National Guard Bio

1877 births
1922 deaths
People from Burlington, Kansas
United States Army colonels
American military personnel of World War I
American military personnel of the Philippine–American War
United States Army Medal of Honor recipients
Recipients of the Distinguished Service Cross (United States)
Burials at Arlington National Cemetery
Philippine–American War recipients of the Medal of Honor